This article includes a list of successive Islamic states and Muslim dynasties beginning with the time of the Islamic prophet Muhammad (570–632 CE) and the early Muslim conquests that spread Islam outside of the Arabian Peninsula, and continuing through to the present day.

The first-ever establishment of an Islamic polity goes back to the Islamic State of Medina, which was established by Muhammad in the city of Medina in 622 CE. Following his death in 632 CE, his immediate successors established the Rashidun Caliphate, which was further succeeded by the Umayyad Caliphate and later the Abbasid Caliphate.
 
While the primary caliphates gradually fractured and fell, other Muslim dynasties rose; some of these dynasties established notable and prominent Islamic empires, such as the Ottoman Empire centered around Anatolia, the Safavid Empire of Persia, and the Mughal Empire in India.

Middle East and North Africa

Mesopotamia and Levant (Iraq, Jordan, Lebanon, Palestine, Syria)
Umayyad caliphate (661–750, based in Damascus)
Abbasid caliphate (750–1258, based in Baghdad)
Ayyubid dynasty (1171–1341, based in Damascus and Aleppo)
Zengid dynasty (1127–1250, based in Aleppo)
Burid dynasty (1104–1154)
Hamdanid dynasty (890–1004, based in Aleppo)
Uqaylid dynasty (990–1096; Syria, Iraq)
Bani Assad (990–1081, Iraq)
Numayrid (990–1081; Syria, Turkey)
Marwanid (983–1085; Syria, Turkey, Armenia, Iraq)
Mirdasid dynasty (1024–1080, Syria)
Artuqids (1101–1409; Syria, Turkey, Iraq)
Baban (1649–1851, Iraq)
Soran (1816–1835, Iraq)
Emirate of Hakkari (1380s–1845; Turkey, Syria)
Bahdinan (1339–1843, Iraq)
Bohtan (1330–1855)
Principality of Bitlis (1182–1847)
Hadhabani (906–1070)
Mukriyan (1050–1500)
Qarghuyah, Emirate of Aleppo (969–977)
Nizari Ismaili state (1090–1256; Iraq, Iran, Syria)
Emirate of Aleppo, Lulu' dynasty (1004–1016)
Assaf dynasty (1306–1591, Lebanon)
Harfush dynasty (1517–1865, Lebanon, Syria)
Mamluk dynasty of Iraq (1734–1831)
Emirate of Mosul (905–1096, 1127–1222, 1254–1383, 1758–1918)
Emirate of Transjordan (1921–1946; Jordan, Saudi Arabia, Iraq)
Arab Kingdom of Syria (1920)
Kingdom of Iraq (1921–1958)
Kingdom of Jordan (1921–present)

Arabian Peninsula and Persian Gulf

Saudi Arabia
Rashidun Caliphate (632-661)
Emirate of Mecca (1916–1924) Saudi State
Emirate of Riyadh (1903-1918) Saudi State
Manfuha Sheikhdom (1682–1834)
Abu Arish Sheikhdom (1200–1863)
Al Bir Sheikhdom (1600–1850)
Al Rawdah Sheikhdom (1697–1790)
Al-Kharj Emirate (1688–1865)
Unaizah Emirate (1768–1904)
Buraidah Emirate (1768–1913)
Awdah Sheikhdom (1700–1790)
Jalajil Sheikhdom (1762–1831)
Harmah Sheikhdom (1700–1779)
Al Majma'ah Sheikhdom (1758–1908)
Shaqraa Sheikhdom (1803–1834)
Mutayr Sheikhdom (1872–1903)
'Asir Sheikhdom (983–1003, 1728–1863)
Sheikdom of Upper Asir (1802–1923)
Sheikhdom of Lower 'Asir (1830–1930)
Principality of Najran (1633–1934)
'Uyayna Sheikhdom (1446–1768)
Dhurma Sheikhdom (1600–1757)
Gatgat Sultanate (1900–1924)
Al Murrah Emirate (1900–1917)
Emirate of Diriyah (1744–1818) (First Saudi State)
Emirate of Nejd (1818–1891) (Second Saudi State)
Emirate of Nejd and Hasa (1902–1921) (Third Saudi State)
Sharifate of Mecca (968–1925)
Emirate of Jabal Shammar (1836–1921)
Sultanate of Nejd (1921–1926)
Idrisid Emirate of Asir (1909–1930)
Kingdom of Hejaz (1916–1925)
Kingdom of Hejaz and Nejd (1926–1932)
Bani Khalid (1669–1796)
House of Saud (1744–present)

Bahrain
Qarmatians (899–1077)
Uyunid Kingdom (1076–1253)
Usfurid (1253–1320)
Jarwanid (1305–1487)
Jabrids (1480–1570) 
Bani Khalid (1669–1796)
House of Khalifa (1783–present)

Qatar
House of Thani (1825–present)

Kuwait
House of Al-Sabah (1752–present)

United Arab Emirates
Emirate of Abu Dhabi (1761–present)
Emirate of Ajman (1816–present)
Emirate of Dubai (1833–present)
Emirate of Fujairah (1876–present)
Emirate of Ras Al Khaimah (1727–present)
Emirate of Sharjah (1803–present)
Emirate of Umm Al Quwain (1775–present)
Dibba (1871–1953)
Hamriyya (1875–1922)
Hira (1915–1942)
Kalba (1871–1952)

Oman
Sultanate of Zafar (1421–1975)
Imamate of Oman (750–1696)
Omani Empire (1696–1856)
Sultanate of Muscat and Oman (1820–1970)
Sultanate of Oman (1970–present)

Yemen
Banu Ukhaidhir (865–1066)
Mutawakkilite Kingdom of Yemen (1918-1970)
Zurayids (1083-1174)
Hamdanids (1099-1174)
Sulaymanids (1063-1174)
Mahdids (1159-1174)
Sulayhid dynasty (1047-1138)
Rassids of Yemen (897-1962)
Rasulid of Yemen (1229-1454)
Najahid dynasty (1022-1158)
Ziyadid dynasty (819-856)
Tahirid dynasty (1454-1517)
Bani Ukhaidhir (865-1066)
Yufirids (847-997)
Yemeni Zaidi State (1547-1849)
Alawi Sheikhdom (1743-1967)
Aqrabi Sheikhdom (1770-1967)
Audhali Sultanate (1750-1970)
Lower Aulaqi Sultanate (1700-1967)
Upper Aulaqi Sheikhdom (1750-1967)
Upper Aulaqi Sultanate (1700-1967)
Beihan Emirate (1680-1967)
Sheikhdom of al-Hawra (1858-1967)
Emirate of Dhala (1750-1967)
Dathina Sheikhdom (1947-1967)
Fadhli Sultanate (1670-1967)
Sultanate of Haushabi (1730-1967)
Lahej Sultanate (1728-1967)
Maflahi Sheikhdom (1850-1967)
Sheikhdom of Shaib (1850-1967)
Sultanate of Lower Yafa (1681-1967)
Sultanate of Upper Yafa (1800-1967)
Sheikhdom Al-Dhubi (1750-1967)
Hadrami Sheikhdom (1820-1967)
Emirate of Mawsata (1780-1967)
Sheikhdom of al-Irqa (1800-1967)
Mahra Sultanate (1432–1967)
Kathiri Sultanate (1395-1967)
Tarim Sultanate (1916-1945)
Qu'aiti Sultanate (1858-1967)
Ash Shihr (1752-1858)
Al Mukalla (1707-1881)

Regional
Tulunids (868–905; Egypt, Syria)
Rassids (897–1962)
Qarmatian Kingdom (899–976)
Sharifate of Mecca (968–1925)
Ayyubid Dynasty (1171–1260)
Rasulids (1229–1454)
Mamluk Dynasty (1250–1517)
Omani Sultanate (1696–1856)
Kingdom of Saudi Arabia (1932–present)

North Africa (Algeria, Egypt, Libya, Morocco, Tunisia)

Rustamid dynasty (777–909)
Aghlabid dynasty (800–909; Ifriqiya, Tunisia, East-Algeria, West-Libya, Sicily)
Fatimid dynasty (909–1171; North Africa, Middle East)
Zirid dynasty (972–1148)
Almoravid dynasty (1040–1147; Maghreb, Spain)
Almohad dynasty (1121–1269)
Ayyubid dynasty (1171–1254)
Hafsid dynasty (1229–1574)
Nasrid dynasty (1232–1492; Granada, Ceuta)
Marinid dynasty (1244–1465)
Abbasid Caliph (1250–1517; North Africa, Middle East) under Mamluk Sultanate of Cairo
Wattasid dynasty (1472–1554)
Saadi dynasty (1511–1628)
Alaouite dynasty (1631–present)

Algeria
Emirate of Tlemcen (736–790)
Emirate of Cordoba (756-929)
Rustamid dynasty (777–909)
Banu Ifran (830–1040)
Fatimid dynasty (909–1171)
Zirid dynasty (972–1148)
Confederation of Banu Mzab (1012–1882)
Hammadid dynasty (1014–1152)
Almohad dynasty (1121–1269)
Kingdom of Tlemcen (1235–1556)
Hafsid Emirate of Be’jaîa (1285-1510)
Zab Emirate (1402)
Sultanate of Tuggurt (1414–1854)
Kingdom of Ait Abbas (1510–1872)
Kingdom of Kuku (1515–1638)
Kingdom of Algiers (1515–1837)
Emirate of Abdelkader (1832–1847)
Zenata Kingdoms

Egypt
Tulunids (868–905)
Fatimid dynasty (909-1171)
Ikhshidids (935–969)
Banu Kanz (1004–1412)
Ayyubid dynasty (1171–1254)
Mamluk dynasty (1250–1517)
Abbasid Caliph (1250–1517) under Mamluk Sultanate of Cairo
Khedivate of Egypt (1867–1914)
Sultanate of Egypt (1914–1922)
Kingdom of Egypt (1922–1953)

Tunisia
Aghlabid dynasty (800–909)
Khurasanid dynasty (1059–1158)
Hafsid Kingdom (1229–1574)
Hafsid Kingdom of Béjaïa
Beylik of Tunis (1573–1613)
Muradid dynasty (1613–1705)
Husaynid dynasty (1705–1956)
Kingdom of Tunisia (1956–1957)

Morocco
Emirate of Nekor (710–1019)
Emirate of Sijilmasa (758–1055)
Muhallabids (771–793, Ifriqiya)
Idrisid dynasty (788–974)
Almoravid dynasty (1040–1147)
Almohad dynasty (1121–1269 CE)
Marinid Sultanate (1244-1465, Maghreb)
Wattasid dynasty (1472–1554)
Saadi Sultanate (1549–1659)
Pashalik of Timbuktu (1591–1833; Western Sahara, Maghreb, Mali)
Naqsid principality of Tetouan (1597–1673)
Republic of Bou Regreg (1627–1668)
Alaouite dynasty (1666–present)
Republic of the Rif (1921–1926)
Zenata Kingdoms

Libya
Sultanate of Fezzan (918–1190)
Sultanate of Tripolitania (1327–1401) under Bani Ammar
Pasha of Tripoli (1551–1711)
Kingdom of Fezzan (1556–1856) under Awlad Muhammad dynasty
Karamanli dynasty (1711–1835)
Cyrenaica Emirate (1843–1951)
Kingdom of Libya (1951–1969)

Horn of Africa
Somalia
Hawiye Kingdom (500-1300)
Tunni Sultanate (900–1300)
Mogadishu Sultanate (900–1300)
Ajuran Sultanate (1300-1798)
Hiraab Imamate (1600–1860)
Majeerteen Sultanate (1600–1927)
Geledi Sultanate (1843–1908)
Hobyo Sultanate (1878–1925) 

Sultanate of Showa (896-1285)
Sultanate of Ifat (1185–1415)
Adal Sultanate (1415–1555)
Isaaq Sultanate (1750–1884)
Habr Yunis Sultanate (1769-1907)
Zeila Emirate (1415–1420)
Harla Kingdom (501-1500)
Sultanate of Dawaro (915-1329)

Ethiopia
Harla Kingdom (501-1500)
Sultanate of Showa (896–1285)
Sultanate of Dawaro (915-1329)
Sultanate of Bale (1200-1324)
Sultanate of Arababni (1200–1314)
Hadiya Sultanate (1200–1495)
Sultanate of Ifat (1285–1415)
Fatagar (1400-1650)
Adal Sultanate (1415–1577)
Sultanate of Harar (1526–1577)
Imamate of Aussa (1557–1672)
Emirate of Harar (1647–1887)
Sultanate of Aussa (1734–present)
Isaaq Sultanate (1750–1884)
Habr Yunis Sultanate (1769-1907)
Wollo Kingdom (1760–1896)
Kingdom of Gimma (1770–1902)
Kingdom of Gumma (1770–1902)
Kingdom of Jimma (1790–1932)
Gobaad Sultanate (1800–present)
Kingdom of Limmu-Ennarea (1801–1890)
Kingdom of Gera (1835–1887)

Eritrea
Sultanate of Dahlak (1050–1557)
Beja Kingdom (930-1500)

Djibouti
Tadjoura Sultanate (1450–present)
Rahayta Sultanate (1600–present)

Persian Plateau

Iran

Paduspanid (665–1598)
Dulafid dynasty (800–898, Jibal)
Justanids (805–1004)
Samanid Empire (819–999)
Tahirid dynasty (821–873)
Qarinvand dynasty (823–1110)
Saffarid dynasty (861–1003)
Shirvanshah (861–1538)
Alavid dynasty (864–928)
Sajid dynasty (889–929)
Ma'danids (890–1110, Makran)
Aishanids (912–961)
Sallarid dynasty (919–1062)
Ziyarid dynasty (928–1043)
Banu Ilyas (932–968)
Buyid dynasty (934–1062)
Rawadid dynasty (955–1071, Tabriz)
Hasanwayhid (959–1015)
Annazids (990–1180; Iran, Iraq)
Ma'munid dynasty (995–1017)
Kakuyid (1008–1141)
Great Seljuq Empire (1029–1194)
Nasrid dynasty (Sistan) (1029–1225)
Kerman Seljuk Sultanate (1041-1187)
Hormuz Kingdom (1060–1622)
Khwarezmian Empire under Khwarezm-Shâh dynasty (1077–1231)
Nizari Ismaili state (1090–1256)
Ahmadilis (1122–1220)
Eldiguzids (1135–1225)
Atabegs of Yazd (1141–1319)
Salghurids (1148–1282, Shiraz)
Hazaraspids (1155–1424)
Khorshidi dynasty (1155–1597, Lorestan)
Qutlugh-Khanids (1222–1306)
Mihrabanid dynasty (1236–1537, Baluchistan)
Kart dynasty (1244–1381)
Ilkhanate (Mongol) (1295–1357)
Muzaffarids (1314–1393)
Sarbadars (1332–1386)
Chupanids (1335–1357)
Injuids (1335–1357)
Jalayirid Sultanate (1335–1432)
Afrasiyab dynasty (1349–1504)
Marashis (1359–1596)
Kara Koyunlu (1374–1468)
Ak Koyunlu (1378–1501)
Musha'sha'iyyah (1436–1729)
Talysh Khanate (1747–1832)
Maku Khanate (1747–1922)
Ardabil Khanate (1747–1808)
Khalkhal Khanate (1747–1809)
Khoy Khanate (1747–1813)
Maragheh Khanate (1610–1925)
Marand Khanate (1747–1828)
Sarab Khanate (1747–1797)
Tabriz Khanate (1747–1802)
Urmia Khanate (1747–1865)
Emirate of Muhammara (1740-1925)
Safavid dynasty (1502–1736)
Afsharid dynasty (1736–1796)
Zand dynasty (1751–1794)
Qajar dynasty (1789–1925)
Pahlavi dynasty (1925–1979)

Anatolia (Turkey)

Great Seljuk Empire (1029–1194)
Ottoman Empire (1299–1923)
Seljuk Sultanate of Rûm (1077–1308)
Danishmends Dynasty (1071–1178)
Mengujekids Dynasty (1072–1277)
Saltukids Dynasty (1071–1202)
Artuqids Dynasty (1101–1409)
Karamanids (1250–1487)
Chaka of Smyrna (1081–1098)
Shah-Armens (1100–1207)
Beylik of Dilmac (1085–1398)
Inalids (1095–1183)
Beylik of Cubukogullari (1085–1112)
Afshar (1480–1534)
Ahiler (1290–1362)
Alaiye (1293–1471)
Aydinids (1300–1425)
Beyliks of Canik (1300–1460)
Jandarids (1291–1461)
Chobanids (1211–1309)
Dulkadirids (1348–1522)
Eretnids (1335–1390)
Erzincan (1379–1410)
Eshrefids (1285–1326)
Germiyanids (1300–1429)
Hamidids (1300–1391)
Kadi Burhan al-Din (1381–1398)
Karasids (1296–1357)
Ladik (1262–1391)
Mentese (1261–1424)
Pervaneoglu (1277–1322)
Ramadanids (1352–1608)
Sahib Ataids (1275–1341)
Sarukhanids (1300–1410)
Teke (1321–1423)
Emirate of Melitene (850–934)
Amida (983–1085)
Ayyubid dynasty (1171-1341)
Zurarid Emirate of Arzen (850-930)
Emirate of Bingöl (1231-1864)
Emirate of Bradost (1510-1609)
Emirate of Bitlis (1182-1815)
Emirate of Çemiçgezek(1200-1663)
Emirate of Hasankeyf (1232-1524)
Emirate of Hakkari (1380-1847)
Emirate of Pazooka (1499-1587)
Emirate of Palu (1495-1850)

Azerbaijan
Eldiguzids (1136-1225)
Shirvanshah (1207–1607)
Ak Koyunlu (1378-1501)
Kara Koyunlu (1374-1468) 
Shamakhy Khanate (1721–1749)
Salyan Khanate (1729–1782)
Karabakh Khanate (1748-1822)
Erivan Khanate (1747-1828)
Afsharid dynasty (1736-1796)
Safavid dynasty (1501-1736)
Shaki Khanate (1743-1819)
Ganja khanate (1747-1805)
Quba Khanate (1726-1806)
Baku Khanate (1735-1806)
Khalkhal Khanate (1747–1809)
Nakhichevan Khanate (1747-1828)
Shirvan Khanate (1748-1820)
Khoja Shamakha (1748–1786)
Yeni Shamakha (1748–1786)
Ardabil Khanate (1747-1808)
Urmia Khanate (1747-1865)
Javad Khanate (1747-1805)
Shirvan Khanate (1748-1820)
Talysh Khanate (1747-1828)
Elisu Sultanate (1604–1844)
Great Seljuk Empire (1037-1194)
Derbent Khanate (1747-1806)
Qajar dynasty (1789-1925)
Shamakha ll (1786–1844)

Armenia
Emirate of Armenia (697–700, 711–885)
Erivan Khanate (1736–1827)
Karabakh Khanate (1606–1806)
Shaddadids (951–1199)
Sallarid dynasty (919–1062)
Sajid dynasty (889–929)
Marwanid dynasty (983–1085)
Eldiguzids (1135–1225)

Georgia
Emirate of Tbilisi (736–1122)
Principality of Abkhazia (1463-1864)
Caucasus
Emirate of Derbent (654-1747)
Caucasian Imamate (1828–1859)
Chechen Republic of Ichkeria (1991–2000)
Derbent Khanate (1747–1806)
Avar Khanate (1240–1864)
Gazikumukh Shamkhalate (740–1640)
Shamkhalate of Tarki (1640–1867)
Gazikumukh Khanate (1642–1860)
Abazinia (1400–1800)
North Caucasian Emirate (1919–1920)
Circassia (1427-1864)
Kabardia (1453-1825)

Afghanistan
Farighunids (800–1010)
Kart dynasty (1244–1381, based in Herat)
Afsharid Empire (1736–1796)
Emirate of Afghanistan (1823–1926)
Emirate of Afghanistan (1929) 
Kingdom of Afghanistan (1926–1973)
Islamic Emirate of Afghanistan (1996–2001)
Barakzai dynasty (1826–1973)
Hotaki dynasty (1709–1738)
Durrani Empire (1747–1826)
Azad Khan (1750–1758)
Shiberghan Khanate (1757–1875)
Sar-e Pol Khanate (1510–1875)
Maymana Khanate (1506–1900)
Khulm Khanate (1800–1849)
Kunduz Khanate (1508–1888)
Ghuriyan Khanate (1803–1816)
Badakshan Khanate (1657–1773)
Andkhoy Khanate (1730–1880)
Ghazni (1879–1880)
Peshawar (1747–1823)
Qandahar (1704–1881)
Herat (1695–1881)
Kabul Kingdom (1747–1901)
Islamic Emirate of Kunar (1991)
Islamic Emirate of Badakhshan (1996)
Islamic Revolutionary State of Afghanistan (1980)

Indian subcontinent

Bangladesh
Khalji dynasty (1204-1231)
 Balban dynasty (1287-1324)
Bengal Sultanate (1352-1576) under:
 Ilyas Shahi dynasty (1342–1415, 1437-1487)
Bani Ganesh (1418–1437)
 Hussain Shahi dynasty (1493-1538)
Muhammad Shahi dynasty (1554-1564)
Karrani dynasty (1564-1576)
 Nawabs of Bengal (1717-1880)
 Prithimpassa Estate (1499-1950)
 Pratapgarh Kingdom (1489-1700)
 Taraf Kingdom (1200-1610)
 Baro-Bhuiyan (1576-1611)

Pakistan
Ghurids (879–1215)
Ghaznavids (977–1186)
Mughal empire (1526–1857)
Durrani empire (1747–1826)
In Sindh
Habbari dynasty (841–1024)
Soomra dynasty (1026–1351)
Samma dynasty (1351–1524)
Arghun dynasty (1520–1591)
Tarkhan dynasty (1554–1591)
Kalhora dynasty (1701–1783)
Talpur dynasty (1783–1843)
Khairpur (princely state) (1783–1947)
In Punjab
Emirate of Multan (855–1010)
Langah Sultanate (1445–1540)
Bahawalpur (princely state) (1727–1947)
Chieftaincy of Pothohar (1394–1769)
In Kashmir (1339–1586)
Shah Mir dynasty (1339–1561)
Chak dynasty (1554-1586)
Northern dynasties (780–1947)
Trakhan dynasty (780–1821)
Maqpon dynasty (1190–1840)
Hunza (princely state) (1700–1974)
Nagar (princely state) (1660–1974)
Dynasties of Chitral
Raees Dynasty (1320–1570)
Katoor dynasty (1570–1947)
In Khyber
Qarlughids (1238–1266)
Pakhal Sarkar (1472–1703)
Emirate of Waziristan (2004–2014)
Swat (princely state) (1849–1972)
Amb (princely state) (1772–1971)
Phulra (princely state) (1828–1950)
Dir (princely state) (1626–1969)
Jandol State (1830–1972)
In Balochistan
Las Bela (princely state) (1742–1955)
Kharan (princely state) (1697–1955)
Makran (princely state) (1898–1955)
Khanate of Kalat (1666–1955)

India

Delhi Sultanate (1206–1526)
Mamluk dynasty of Delhi (1206–1290)
Khalji Dynasty (1290–1320)
Tughlaq dynasty (1321–1414)
Sayyid Dynasty (1414–1451)
Lodi dynasty (1451–1526)
Bengal Sultanate (1352–1576)
Khandesh Sultanate under Farooqi dynasty (1382–1601)
Jaunpur Sultanate (1394–1479)
Gujarat Sultanate (1407–1573)
Malwa Sultanate (1392–1562)
Sur Empire (1540–1556)
Mughal Empire (1526–1857)
Bahmani Sultanate (1347–1527)
Madurai Sultanate (1335–1378)
Mysore Kingdom (1749–1799) under Hyder Ali, Tippu Sultan
Deccan sultanates (1489–1687)
Bidar Sultanate (1489–1619)
Ahmadnagar Sultanate (1490–1637)
Berar Sultanate (1490–1572)
Bijapur Sultanate (1490–1686)
Golconda Sultanate (1518–1687)
Nagpur Kingdom (1580-1885)
Nawab of Bengal and Murshidabad (1707-1880)
Arcot State (1692–1855)
Oudh State (1732–1858)
Balasinor State (1758–1948)
Banda (state) (1790–1858)
Nawab of Banganapalle (1665–1947)
Baoni State (1784–1947)
Basoda State (1753–1947)
Bhopal State (1723–1947)
Dujana (1806–1947)
Nawab of Farrukhabad (1714–1802)
Hyderabad State (1724–1949)
Jafarabad State (1650–1948)
Janjira State (1489–1948)
Jaora State (1808–1948)
Junagadh State (1730–1948)
Kamadhia (1817–1947)
Cambay State (1730–1948)
Arakkal Kingdom (1545–1819)
Nawab of Kurnool (1690–1839)
Kurwai State (1713–1923)
Loharu State (1806–1931)
Malerkotla State (1468–1947)
Bantva Manavadar (1733–1947)
Mohammadgarh State (1818–1947)
Palanpur State (1597–1947)
Pataudi State (1804–1931)
Pathari State (1794–1947)
Radhanpur State (1753–1948)
Nawab of Rajouri (1194–1846)
Rampur State (1719–1947)
Sachin State (1791–1947)
Sardargarh Bantva (1743–1948)
Savanur State (1680–1912)
Nawab of Surat (1733–1842)
Tonk State (1817–1947)
Zainabad (1903–1947)
Mewat (1372–1527)
Kharagpur Raj (1503–1840)
Qaimkhani (1384–1731)
Lalkhani
Kingdom of Rohilkhand (1710–1857)
Nanpara (1632–1947)
Nawab of Mamdot (1800–1947)
Bhikampur and Datawali (Aligarh) State (1750–1947)
Nawab of Farrukhnagar (1732–1947)
Nawab of Chhatari (1680–1981)
Nawab of Sardhana (1842–1947)
Faujdars of Purnea (1704-1947)
Nawab of Pahasu (1825-1969)

Southern Europe
Spain & Portugal

Emirate of Cordoba (756–929)
Caliph of Cordoba (929-1031)
Taifa of Arjona (1232-1244)
Taifa of Barcelona (716-801)
Taifa of Baeza (1224-1226)
Taifa of Ceuta (1026-1079)
Taifa of Constantina and Hornachuelos (1143-1150)
Taifa of Guadix and Baza (1145-1151)
Taifa of Saltes and Huelva (1012-1051)
Taifa of Jaen (1145-1168)
Taifa of Lérida (1039-1046,1102-1110)
Taifa of Murviedro and Sagunto (1086-1092)
Taifa of Orihuela (1239-1249)
Taifa of Purchena (1145-1150)
Taifa of Segura (1147-1150)
Taifa of Tortosa (1010-1099)
Taifa of Tejada (1146-1150)
Taifa of Valencia (1010-1238)
Taifa of Alpuente (1009–1106)
Taifa of Badajoz (1009–1151)
Taifa of Morón (1010–1066)
Taifa of Toledo (1010–1085)
Taifa of Tortosa (1010–1099)
Taifa of Arcos (1011–1145)
Taifa of Almería (1010–1147)
Taifa of Denia (1010–1227)
Taifa of Valencia (1010–1238)
Taifa of Murcia (1011–1266)
Taifa of Albarracín (1012–1104)
Taifa of Zaragoza (1013–1110)
Taifa of Granada (1013–1145)
Taifa of Carmona (1013–1150)
Taifa of Santa María de Algarve (1018–1051)
Taifa of Mallorca (1018–1203)
Taifa of Lisbon (1022–1093)
Taifa of Seville (1023–1091)
Taifa of Niebla (1023–1262)
Taifa of Córdoba (1031–1091)
Taifa of Mértola (1033–1151)
Taifa of Algeciras (1035–1058)
Taifa of Ronda (1039–1065)
Taifa of Silves (1040–1151)
Taifa of Málaga (1073–1239)
Taifa of Molina (c. 1080's–1100)
Taifa of Lorca (1228–1250)
Taifa of Menorca (1228–1287)
Emirate of Granada (1228–1492)
 
France
 Fraxinetum (887-972)
 The Emirate of Septimania, Southern France (Gaul) (719-759) Rule by:
Umayyad Caliph of Cordova
 
Italy
 The Emirate of Bari (847–871)
 The Emirate of Taranto (831-880)
 The Emirate of Sicily (802-1091) Rule by:
Wali of Sicily (802-827) Euphemius & Asad
 Aghlabids of Sicily (827-909)
 Fatimids of Sicily (909-965)
 Emirate of Sicily (965-1091) Kalbids

Gibraltar
Gibraltar Maghreb (711-1462)

West and East Africa (West and East Africa, Sahel) 
Sudan, South Sudan
Banu Kanz (1004–1412) Nubian
Kingdom of al-Abwab (1276–1560)
Darfur Sultanate (1445–1916)
Dar Fertit (1700-1873)
Dar al Masalit Sultanate (1884–1921)
Dar Qimr Sultanate (1850–1945)
Funj Sultanate (1503–1821)
Kingdom of Fazughli (1685–1821) Under Sennar
Kordofan Sultanate (1700–1821)
Khedivate of Egypt (1867–1914)
Mahdiyya (1889–1898)
Sultanate of Egypt (1914–1z922)
Kingdom of Egypt (1922–1958)

Mauritania
Emirate of Brakna (1600–1934)
Emirate of Trarza (1640–present)
Emirate of Adrar (1740–1932)
Emirate of Tagant (1580–present)

Niger
Dendi Kingdom (1591–1901)
Sultanate of Agadez (1449–1900)
Sultanate of Damagaram (1731–present)
Dosso kingdom (1750–present)
Sultanate Maradi (1807–present)
Tera Kingdom (1700–present)
Kokoro Kingdom (1700–1901)
Goure Kingdom (1700–1960)
Dargol Kingdom (1700–1901)
Emirate of Say (1825-1860)

Nigeria
Bornu Empire (1380–1893)
Sokoto Caliphate (1804–1903)
Hausa Kingdoms (1696–1831)
Nupe Kingdom (1531–1872)
Biu Kingdom (1535–1740)
Gadawur Kingdom (1421–1807)
Biram Kingdom (1110–1808)
Kingdom of Ila Orangun (1680–present)
Iwo Kingdom (1415–present)
Kingdom of Kano (999–1349)
Sultanate of Kano (1350–1805)
Sultanate of Kebbi (1515–1831)
Yauri Kingdom (1400–1799)
Zamfara Kingdom (1200–1804)
Zaria Kingdom (1200–1896)
Osogbo Kingdom (1760–present)
Ede Kingdom (1858–present)
Suleja Emirate (1804–present)
Adamawa Emirate (1809–present)
Agaie Emirate (1832–present)
Bade Emirate (1818–present)
Bashar Emirate
Bauchi Emirate (1805–present)
Bida Emirate (1856–present)
Biu Emirate (1740–present)
Birnin Gwari
Borgu Emirate (1730–present)
Borno Emirate (1902–present)
Damaturu Emirate (2004–present)
Daura Emirate (1778–present)
Dikwa Emirate (1901–present)
Fika Emirate (1806–present)
Gobir Kingdom (1694–1800)
Gobir Emirate (1800–present)
Gombe Emirate (1804–present)
Gujba Emirate (2000–present)
Gumel Emirate (1750–present)
Gusau Emirate (1997–present)
Gwandu Emirate (1849–present)
Hadejia Emirate (1808–present)
Ohinoyi of Ebiraland (1904–present)
Ilorin Emirate (1824–present)
Jajere Emirate (2000–present)
Jama'are Emirate (1811–present)
Jema'a Emirate (1810–present)
Kano Emirate (1805–present)
Katagum Emirate (1807–present)
Katsina Emirate (1903–present)
Kazaure Emirate (1819–present)
Kebbi Emirate (1849–present)
Keffi Emirate (1802–present)
Kontagora Emirate (1858–present)
Koton Karifi (1800–present)
Lafia Emirate (1650–present)
Lafiagi Emirate (1975–present)
Lapai Emirate (1825–present)
Lere Emirate (1808–present)
Machina Emirate
Misau Emirate (1850–present)
Mubi Emirate (1805–present)
Muri Emirate (1817–present)
Nasarawa Emirate (1835–present)
Ningi Emirate (1827–present)
Pategi Emirate (1897–present)
Potiskum Emirate (1809–present)
Tula Chiefdom (2003–present)
Rano Emirate (1819–present)
Rano Kingdom (523–1819)
Yauri Emirate (1799–present)
Zamfara Emirate (1804–present)
Zazzau Emirate (1808–present)
Agbede (1880–present)
Ajasse Ipo (1749–present)
Ado-Odo Kingdom (1494–present)
Auchi (1819–present)
Kaiama Emirate (1770–present)
Dutse Emirate (1807–present)
Gwoza Emirate (1919–present)
Ibadan (1820–present)
Bichi Emirate (2019–present)
Gaya Emirate (2019–present)
Karaye Emirate (2019–present)
Gwanara Emirate (1810–present)
Shanga Emirate (1859–present)
Wase Emirate (1820–present)
Yashikira Emirate (1769–present)
Bwari Emirate (1976–present)

Mali
Ghana Empire (500–1200)
Mali Empire (1230–1670)
Gao Empire (750–1430)
Songhai Empire (1340–1591)
Pashalik of Timbuktu (1591–1833)
Sosso Empire (1100–1235)
Bamana Empire (1712–1862)
Kaarta Empire (1753–1854)

Regional
Fulani Empire of Sokoto (1804–1903)
Fulani or Fulbe Empire of Macina of Seku Amadu (1818–1862)
Fulani or Fulbe Empire of El Hajj Oumar Tall, Toucouleur Empire (1848–1898)
Fulani or Fulbe Empire of Bundu (state) of Malick Daouda Sy (1669–1954)
Kanem Empire (700–1380)
Bornu Empire (1380–1893)
Wadai Empire (1501–1912)
Ghana Empire (500–1200)
Mali Empire (1230–1670)

Cameroon
Bafut Kingdom (1750–present)
Kotoko kingdom (1450–present)
Bamum Kingdom (1394–present)
Banyo Kingdom (1830–present)
Bibemi Sultanate (1770–present)
Garoua Sultanate (1810–present)
Kontcha Kingdom (1902–present)
Kungi Kingdom (1990–present)
Logone-Birni Kingdom (1805–present)
Mandara Kingdom (1500–present)
Maroua Sultanate (1792–present)
N'Gaoundere Sultanate (1836–present)
Rey Bouba Sultanate (1804–present)
Tibati Lamidate (1810–present)
Bankim Kingdom (1760–present)
Mboum Kingdom (1800–present)

Benin
Kandi Kingdom (1700–present)
Parakou Kingdom (1700–present)
Kwande (1709–1961)
Nikki Kingdom (1700–present)
Djougou (1750–present)

Burkina Faso
Mossi Kingdom (1095–1898)
Wogodogo Kingdom (1182–present)
Yatenga Kingdom (1333–present)
Tenkodogo Kingdom (1120–present)
Bilanga Kingdom (1700–present)
Koala Kingdom (1810–present)
Nungu Kingdom (1204–present)
Pama Kingdom (1600–present)
Gurunsi Kingdom (1870–1897)
Liptako Kingdom (1810–present)
Gwiriko Kingdom (1714–1915)

Chad
Kanem Empire (700–1380)
Wadai Empire (1501–1912)
Sultanate of Yao (1400-1890)
Tunjur kingdom (1400–1650)
Kingdom of Baguirmi (1485–1898)
Dar Sila (1213–1643)
Dar Runga (1700–1898)
Rabih az Zubaiyr (1860-1900)
Kabka Sultanate (1990-Present)

Central African Republic
Dar al Kuti Sultanate (1830–1912)
Rafai Sultanate (1800–1966)
Zemio Sultanate (1830–1923)
Bangassou Sultanate (1780–1966)

Côte d'Ivoire
Kong Empire (1690–1913)
Kabasarana (1846–1880)
Bouna Kingdom (1600–present)

Ghana
Dagbon Kingdom (1409–present)
Kingdom of Wala (1317–present)
Mamprusi (1450–present)
Nanumba (1850–present)
Gonja kingdom (1564–present)
Zabarima Emirate (1860–1897)

Senegambia
Imamate of Futa Toro (1776–1821)
Imamate of Futa Jallon (1725–1911)
Empire of Great Fulo (1490–1776)
Jolof Empire (1350–1549)
Kingdom of Jolof (1549–1875)
Cayor (1549–1879)
Kingdom of Sine (1449–1969)
Xaaso (1600–1880)
Takrur Kingdom (800–1285)
Baol (1555–1894)
Waalo (1287–1855)
Kingdom of Saloum (1494–1969)

Gambia
Baro Kingdom (1600–1892)
Fuladugu Kingdom (1867–present)
Marabout Kingdom (1851–1887)

Guinea
Benna Kingdom (1858–1904)
Bramaya Kingdom (1800–1883)
Dubreka Kingdom (1800–1888)
Fuuta Jalon (1726–1912)
Kanea Kingdom (1800–1880)
Kinsam Kingdom (1850–1894)
Koba Kingdom (1700–1898)
Landuma Kingdom (1700–1892)
Nalu Kingdom (1845–1884)
Samburu Kingdom (1700–1892)
Solima Kingdom (1850–1894)
Timbi Tunni Kingdom (1800–1890)

Guinea Bissau
N'Gabu Kingdom (1850–1903)

Togo
Kotokolia (1785–present)
Tchamba (1750–present)
Bafilo (1700–present)
Bassar (1800–present)
Cokossi (1750–present)

Sierra Leone
Alikalia Kingdom (1817–1898)
Biriwa Chiefdom (1800–present)
Dembelia Sikunia (1850–present)
Imperri Chiefdom (1850–present)
Kaiyamba Chiefdom (1884–present)
Mande (1800–1919)
Nongowa Chiefdom (1820–present)
Safroko Limba Chiefdom (1907–present)
Susu Kingdom (1806–1892)
Kingdom of Koya (1505–1908)
Ko Fransa Kingdom (1700–1859)
Tonko Limba Chiefdom (1836–present)
Wonkafong (1794–1890)

East Africa
Tanzania
Pemba Sultanate (1550–1829)
Hadimu Sultanate  (1650–1873)
Unyanyembe Kingdom (1727–present)
Kilindi dynasty (1750-Present)
Tumbatu Sultanate (1800–1865)
Ujiji Sultanate (1800–present)
Sultanate of Zanzibar (1856–1964)
Uhehu Sultanate (1860–1962)

Kenya
Malindi Kingdom (850-1861)
Kilwa Sultanate (957–1517)
Pate Sultanate (1203–1870)
Mombasa Sultanate (1502–1895)
Wituland (1858–1929)

Democratic Republic of the Congo
Tippu Tip's State (1860–1887)
Sultanate Kasongo (1860-1895)

Malawi
Yao Chieftain (*1500–present)
Jumbes of Nkhotakota (1840-1894)

Mozambique
Angoche Sultanate (1485–1910)
Kitangonya Sheikhdom (1750–1906)
Sankul Sheikhdom (1753–1910)

Indian Ocean Region
Maldives
Sultanate of Maldives (1153–1968)
Sultanate of Mogadishu (1150-1300)
Theemuge dynasty (1161–1338)
Hilaalee dynasty (1388–1558)
Utheemu dynasty (1632–1692)
Hamavi dynasty (1692)
Devadhu dynasty (1692–1701)
Isdhoo dynasty (1701–1704)
Dhiyamigili dynasty (1704–1759, 1766–1773)
Huraa dynasty (1759–1766, 1774–1968)

Mayotte
 The Sultanate of Mwati (1500-1841)
 
Comoros
 The Sultanate of Ndzuwani (1711-1912)
 The Sultanate of Ngazidjia (1400-1912) Sultanate of Bambao
 The Sultanate of Mwali (1830-1909)
 The Sultanate of Bajini (1500-1889)
 The Sultanate of Itsandra (1400-1886)
 The Sultanate of Mitsamihuli
 The Sultanate of Washili
 The Sultanate of Hambuu
 The Sultanate of Hamahame
 The Sultanate of Mbwankuu
 The Sultanate of Mbude 
 The Sultanate of Domba
 
Madagascar
 The Sakalava Kingdom (1500-1898)
 The Antemoro Kingdom (1495-1888)

Eastern Europe (Balkan Region)
Ukraine, Moldova
Crimean Khanate (1441–1783) 
Budjak Horde (1603–1799)

Romania, Bulgaria
Tamrash Republic (1878–1886)
Provisional Government of Western Thrace (1913)

Greece
Pashalik of Yanina (1788–1822) 
Emirate of Crete (820–961)

Albania
Pashalik of Scutari (1757–1831) 
Pashalik of Berat (1774–1809)

Ural Region, Siberia (Russia)
Volga Bulgaria (922–1236)
Golden Horde (1251–1502)
Kazan Khanate (1438–1552)
Astrakhan Khanate (1466–1556)
Qasim Khanate (1452–1681)
Bashkirs (800–1557)
Sibir Khanate (1468–1598)
Great Horde (1466–1502)
Nogai Horde (1440–1634)
Lesser Nogai Horde (1449–1783)
Crimean Khanate (1441–1783)
Mishar Yurt (1298–1393)
Mukhsha Ulus (1300-1500)
Idel-Ural State (1918)

Central Asia, East Asia
Transoxania (Uzbekistan, Kyrgyzstan, Tajikistan, Turkmenistan, Kazakhstan)

Afrighid dynasty (305–995)
Principality of Ushrusana (822–892)
Karakhanid Empire (840–1212, Transoxiana)
Seljuk Empire (1029–1194, based in Merv, Eastern Division
Khwarazmian Empire (1077–1231)
Timurid dynasty (1370–1507)
Chagatai Khanate (Mongol) (1226–1347)
Muhtajids (950–1030)
Yarkent Khanate (1487–1705)
Shaybanid (1428–1599)
Samanid dynasty (819–999)
Ghaznavids (977–1186)
Khanate of Bukhara (1500–1785)
Kazakh Khanate (1456–1847)
Khanate of Khiva (1511–1920)
Khanate of Kokand (1709–1876)
Uzbek Khanate (1428–1471)
White Horde (Mongol) (1360–1428)
Emirate of Bukhara (1785–1920)
Golden Horde (Mongol) (1313–1502)
Bukey Horde (1801–1845)
Sufids (1361–1379)

China
Kara-Khanid Khanate (840–1212, based in Kashgar)
Moghulistan (Mongol) (1347–1462)
Western Moghulistan (1462–1690)
Eastern Moghulistan / Uyghurstan (1462–1680)
Yarkent Khanate (1514–1705)
Turpan Khanate (1487–1570)
Kashgaria Khanate (1865–1877)
Kumul Khanate (1696–1930)
Khoja Kingdom (1693–1857)
Dughlats (1466–1514)
Kingdom of Mangalai (1220–1877)
Pingnan Guo (1856–1873)
First East Turkestan Republic (1933–1934)
Second East Turkestan Republic (1944–1949)
Ma Clique (1919-1928) under General Ma Bufang
Dunganistan (1934-1937)

Southeast Asia
Brunei, Indonesia, Malaysia
Samudera Pasai Sultanate (1267–1521)
Malacca Sultanate (1400–1511)
Bruneian Sultanate (1363–present) 
Aceh Sultanate (1496–1904)
Sultanate of Siak (1723–1949)
Aru Kingdom (1225–1613)
Sultanate of Langkat (1568–1946)
Sultanate of Asahan (1630–1946)
Sultanate of Serdang (1723–1946)
Sultanate of Deli (1632–1946)
Pagaruyung Kingdom (1347–1833)
Sultanate of Johor (1528–present)
Sultanate of Kedah (1136–present)
Sultanate of Kelantan (1267–present)
Sultanate of Perak (1528–present)
Sultanate of Pahang (1470–present)
Sultanate of Selangor (1743–present)
Sultanate of Terengganu (1725–present)
Perlis Kingdom (1843–present)
Negeri Sembilan Kingdom (1773–present)
Sultanate of Sarawak (1599–1641)
Bima Sultanate (1620–1958)
Mataram Sultanate (1586–1755)
Demak Sultanate (1475–1554)
Cirebon Sultanate (1430–1666)
Banten Sultanate (1527–1813)
Kingdom of Pajang (1568–1618)
Yogyakarta Sultanate (1755–present)
Surakarta Sunanate (1755–1945) 
Kingdom of Sumedang Larang (1527–1620)
Kalinyamat Sultanate (1527–1599)
Sultanate of Ternate (1257–1914)
Sultanate of Tidore (1450–1967)
Sultanate of Jailolo (1200s–1832)
Sultanate of Bacan (1322–1965)
Sultanate of Banjar (1526–1860)
Sultanate of Pontianak (1771–1950)
Kutai Kartanegara Sultanate (1600s–1945) 
Sultanate of Sambas (1609–1956)
Sultanate of Sintang (1365–1950)
Sultanate of Bulungan (1731–1964)
Kingdom of Bolaang Mongondow (1670–1950)
Sultanate of Gowa (1300s–1945)
Kingdom of Tallo (1400–1856)
Palembang Sultanate (1659–1823)
Kingdom of Kaimana (1309–1923)
Jambi Sultanate (1550–1905)
Riau-Lingga Sultanate (1824–1911)

Philippines

Kingdom of Manila (1258–1571)
Kingdom of Namayan (1175–1571)
Kingdom of Tondo (1450–1589)
Dapitan Kingdom (1200–1595)
Datu of Mactan (1500–1540)
Sultanate of Maguindanao (1515–1905)
Sultanate of Sulu (1405–1915, 1962–1986)
Bon-bon sultanate
Thailand
Pattani Kingdom (1457–1902)
Sultanate of Singora (1605–1680)
Kingdom of Setul Mambang Segara (1808–1916)
Kingdom of Reman (1810–1902)

See also
 List of Sunni dynasties
 List of Shia dynasties
 Islamic state
 Caliphate
 List of largest empires
 Timeline of Middle Eastern history
 Early Muslim conquests
 History of Islam
 Muslim world
 The Ottomans: Europe's Muslim Emperors
 List of Buddhist Kingdoms and Empires
 List of Hindu empires and dynasties
 List of Jain states and dynasties
 List of Jewish states and dynasties
 List of Zoroastrian states and dynasties
 List of Confucian states and dynasties
 List of Tengrist states and dynasties
 List of Turkic dynasties and countries

Muslim
Lists of dynasties
States and dynasties
Muslim states and dynasties
Muslim empires
Muslim dynasties